Gawaan is a populated place in the north-central Mudug region of Somalia.

Overview
The town is built upon high ground. From this elevation, it is possible to see the city of Hobyo and the Somali Sea, which lies a further 30 km to the east.

Demographics
Gawaan's population mostly belongs to the Somali ethnic group, with the Salebaan sub-clan of the Habar Gidir Hawiye especially well represented.

References
Gawaan, Somalia
Gawaan, Somalia

Populated places in Mudug